Palm sugar  is a sweetener derived from any variety of palm tree. Palm sugar is sometimes qualified by the type of palm, as in coconut palm sugar. While sugars from different palms may have slightly different compositions, all are processed similarly and can be used interchangeably.

Types 
 
The predominant sources of palm sugar are the Palmyra, date, nipa, sugar and coconut palms.

The Palmyra palm (Borassus spp.) is grown in Africa, Asia, and New Guinea. The tree has many uses, such as thatching, hatmaking, timber, use as a writing material, and in food products. Palm sugar is produced from sap ('toddy') from the flowers. 

The date palm has two species, Phoenix dactylifera and P. sylvestris, and both are sources of palm sugar. P. dactylifera is common in the Mediterranean and Middle East. P. sylvestris is native to Asia, mainly Pakistan and India. Date palms are cultivated mainly for dates. Palm sugar is made from the tree's sap. 

The nipa palm (Nypa fruticans) is native to the coastlines and tropical regions of the Indian and Pacific Oceans. It is the only palm tree that grows in a watery mangrove biome. Only its leaves and flowers grow above water. Palm sugar is made from the sugar-rich sap.
   
The sugar palm (Arenga pinnata) is native to the coastal and tropical regions of Asia, mainly China, Malaysia and Indonesia. The sap used to produce palm sugar is known in India as gur and in Indonesia as gula aren.  

The coconut palm (Cocos nucifera) yields coconut palm sugar from the sap of its flowers. It grows in coastal areas of the Indian and Pacific Oceans. Major suppliers are  Thailand, Indonesia, and the Philippines.

Production 
Palm sugar is produced by boiling collected sap until it thickens. The boiled sap can be sold as palm syrup. It is sold in bottles or tins and tends to thicken and crystallise over time. The boiled sap can also be solidified and sold as bricks or cakes.  It can range in colour from golden brown to dark brown or almost black, like Indonesian gula aren.

Use 
Palm sugar is an ingredient in both sweet and savoury dishes used throughout Asia, the Middle East and North Africa.

Local variants 

Palm sugar is known by many names and variants depending on its ingredient, production method, or region.

 is a type of palm sugar made from the sap of flower buds from the coconut palm or, less commonly, other palms. It can be dense and sticky. It is known in English as malacca sugar, probably because it originated in the state of Malacca, Malaysia. Traditionally,  is made by extracting the sap from the flower bud of a coconut tree. Several slits are cut into the bud, and a pot is tied underneath to collect the sap. The sap is then boiled until it thickens. Due to the labour involved in the production, it is often more expensive than the ubiquitous caster sugar. It is used in some savoury dishes but mainly in the local desserts and cakes of the Southeast Asian region.

See also

References 

Malaysian cuisine
Singaporean cuisine
Sugars
Edible palms